Robert Mincham is a New Zealand former rugby league footballer who represented New Zealand in the 1968 World Cup.

His father, Ted, was also a New Zealand international, while his grandfather, William Mincham played for Auckland and later became a senior club, and international referee.

Playing career
Mincham played for the Glenora Bears in the Auckland Rugby League competition and was an Auckland representative. In 1966 he played one test match for the New Zealand national rugby league team.

In 1967 Mincham won the Tetley Trophy as the leading try scorer in the Auckland Rugby League competition when he scored 19 tries that season. He was not selected for the Kiwis in 1967 but in 1968 was named as part of the 1968 World Cup squad. Mincham played in three matches at the tournament.

References

Living people
New Zealand rugby league players
New Zealand national rugby league team players
Auckland rugby league team players
Glenora Bears players
Rugby league wingers
Year of birth missing (living people)